Antonio De Mare (11 December 1909 – 3 September 1969) was an Argentine footballer. He played in three matches for the Argentina national football team in 1935. He was also part of Argentina's squad for the 1935 South American Championship.

References

External links
 

1909 births
1969 deaths
Argentine footballers
Argentina international footballers
Place of birth missing
Association football defenders
Racing Club de Avellaneda footballers